Darren Wright (born 7 September 1979) is an English footballer, who played as a forward in the Football League for Chester City.

References

Chester City F.C. players
Droylsden F.C. players
English Football League players
Association football forwards
1979 births
Living people
English footballers
Footballers from Warrington